Barbara Smith Warner (born 1967) is an American Democratic politician from the U.S. state of Oregon. She served as a member of the Oregon House of Representatives for the 45th district from 2014 to 2022.

Early life and education
Born Barbara Smith in Erie, Pennsylvania, she is a graduate of Gannon University.

Career 
Warner worked as a labor organizer in Washington, D.C., ran the Oregon House Democratic Caucus, and served as a labor liaison for Senator Ron Wyden and has been active as a community organizer for affordable health care and education access.

In November 2013, Michael Dembrow resigned from his seat in the Oregon House of Representatives when he was appointed to fill Jackie Dingfelder's seat in the Oregon Senate. Multnomah County Commissioners appointed Smith Warner to fill Dembrow's seat in the Oregon House a few weeks later. She was sworn in on January 15, 2014, shortly before the 2014 Legislative Short Session. In July 2019, she was elected as Majority Leader by the Oregon House Democratic Caucus, and served until January 2022.

On March 7, 2022, Smith Warner announced she would retire from the legislature. She was succeeded by optometrist Thuy Tran, a fellow Democrat and a former member of the Parkrose School Board.

In February 2023, Smith Warner was named Executive Director of the The National Vote at Home Institute.

Personal life
Smith Warner and her husband Chris Warner, who served as chief of staff to former Portland City Commissioner Steve Novick, live in Portland's Rose City Park neighborhood with their two children.

External links
 Campaign website
 Legislative website

References

1967 births
21st-century American politicians
21st-century American women politicians
Gannon University alumni
Living people
Democratic Party members of the Oregon House of Representatives
Women state legislators in Oregon
Politicians from Erie, Pennsylvania
Politicians from Portland, Oregon